Kimberly is an unincorporated community in Kimberly Township, Aitkin County, Minnesota, United States. The community is located along Aitkin County Road 5 (Nature Avenue) near the junction with County Road 56 (380th Street). Nearby places include Aitkin, Rossburg, Palisade, McGregor, East Lake, and Kimberly Wildlife Management Area. The Rice River flows through the community. State Highways 47 (MN 47) and 210 (MN 210) are both nearby.

History
The community had a post office from 1879 to 1974. Kimberly was named for Moses C. Kimberly, an official of the Northern Pacific Railway.

References

Unincorporated communities in Aitkin County, Minnesota
Unincorporated communities in Minnesota